Pdf-parser is a command-line program that parses and analyses PDF documents. It provides features to extract raw data from PDF documents, like compressed images. pdf-parser can deal with malicious PDF documents that use obfuscation features of the PDF language.
The tool can also be used to extract data from damaged or corrupt PDF documents.

References

PDF software
Public-domain software with source code
2008 software